Luís do Rego Barreto, Viscount Geraz Lima, (28 October 1777, Viana do Castelo – 7 September 1840, Vila Real) better known as General Luis Rego, was a Portuguese military officer and colonial administrator who distinguished himself in the fight against the French invasion of Portugal.

Early life
Natural son of António Rego Barreto - army officer, adjutant of the 2nd Earl of Bobadela when he was Governor of weapons of Minho -was legitimized by his father in 1786, enlisted in 1790 at age 13, at the Infantry Regiment of Lippe, the Lisbon garrison, being lieutenant when the French invaded Portugal in 1807.

Having asked to resign when the Portuguese army, it was reorganized in early 1808, he returned to Viana do Castelo. When Porto rose against collaboration with the French occupiers, Luis organized a Provisional Government Junta in Viana do Castelo, who promoted him to major and instructed to organize the 9th Infantry Regiment, garrison of the city.

Peninsular War
Organized the 4th Caçador Battalion of Beira, in Viseu, having participated with him in the 1808-1811 campaigns, the Battle of Buçaco, in 1810, to Battle of Pombal, in the beginning of the withdrawal of the army of Massena, and the Battle of Fuentes de Oñoro in 1811. participated in the Siege of Ciudad Rodrigo and, as commander of 15th Infantry Regiment, the Siege of Badajoz. Was present at the Battle of Salamanca in 1812 and the Battle of Vitoria in 1813. Their performance in the Siege of San Sebastián was critical, able to cross the gulf separating the allied army from the fortress with his regiment and scaled the walls, managing to take it in September 1813.

Luís commanded the 3rd Portuguese Brigade of the Army until 1815.

Governor of Pernambuco
In 1817 he was appointed governor of the Captaincy of Pernambuco. He was hated by the local population, because he used violent methods to repress the separatist revolt that broke out there. He promoted hangings, quartering of bodies, firing squads, deaths by fire, desecration of corpses and rapes. Many of the executed individuals were innocents.  With the change of government that took place in Portugal in 1820, he did fulfill the orders of constitutional government in Lisbon. Victim of an attempt of assassination he returned to Portugal in 1821.

Back in Portugal

Luís do Rego was appointed governor of weapons of Minho by constitutional government, he was in charge of crushing the revolt of the 2nd Count of Amarante, future Marquis de Chaves, who defeated Amarante in February 1823. With the Vilafrancada reimposing the absolutist regime in Portugal, he was removed from office and deported to Figueira da Foz, and retired in the following year. He reentered the army during the regency of Maria II of Portugal, he was promoted to lieutenant general in 1827.

Arrested during the reign of King Miguel, he managed to escape to Spain, returning after the Concession of Evoramonte. Appointed member of the Supreme Council of Military Justice in 1834, he was reappointed governor of weapons of Minho during the Setembrismo, who appointed him senator for Viana do Castelo, during the short duration of the 1838 Constitution.

The Setembrista government of Maria II awarded him the title of Viscount Geraz Lima on April 27, 1835.

Promotions and Units

Sources
http://www.arqnet.pt/exercito/regobarreto.html (translated)

1777 births
1840 deaths
Portuguese generals
Portuguese military commanders of the Napoleonic Wars
Portuguese military personnel of the Napoleonic Wars
Peninsular War
18th-century Portuguese people
19th-century Portuguese people
People from Viana do Castelo
Viscounts of Portugal